Aryan Vaid (born 4 July 1976) is an Indian model, who won the Graviera Mister India World modelling pageant in the year 2000. He also went on to win the Mister International Award in 2000. He was a contestant in the reality show Bigg Boss in 2006.

Career
Vaid is a qualified chef and a lifestyle columnist with The Hindustan Times. He has been actively involved with theatre and has done a few street plays at the Prithvi theatre in Mumbai. It was during one of these plays that he was offered a role in the television serial, Campus. He has acted in a number of Bollywood movies. He started out his career in a small budget movie Market.

Subsequently, he had a series of small budget movies that did well at the box-office. His first big budget movie was Apne. Even though the movie had an average run, Vaid received decent reviews for his acting and physique. He then moved to the United States.

In 2006, Vaid was a housemate in the first season of Bigg Boss, the Indian version of Celebrity Big Brother, produced by Endemol India for Sony Entertainment Television. Vaid also appeared on Zee TV's show, Rab Se Sonha Ishq as Harry, a cab driver in London.

Television
2006: Bigg Boss 1
(Evicted on Day 35)
2008: Kahaani Hamaaray Mahaabhaarat Ki as Duryodhana
2013: Welcome - Baazi Mehmaan-Nawaazi Ki
2013: Rab Se Sohna Isshq as Harvinder 
2014: Udaan as Kabir
2016-2017: Santoshi Maa as Indra Dev

Filmography

 Market (2003) – Babloo
 Film Star (2005) – Abhishek Sharma
 Chaahat – Ek Nasha (2005) – Rahul Kapoor
 Dubai Babu (2009) – Don (Kannada film)
 Fun – Can Be Dangerous Sometimes (2005) – Raj Solanki
 White Noise (2005)
 Naam Gum Jayega (2005) – Aryan Srivastav
 Sauda – The Deal (2005) – Sameer
 Ek Jind Ek Jaan (2006) (Punjabi) – Karamveer Singh
 Manoranjan (2006) – Rahul
 Aisa Kyon Hota Hai? (2006) – Raj
 Mr 100% – The Real Player (2006) – Rajesh
 Ghutan (2007) – Ravi Kapoor
 Apne (2007) – Gaurav Ghera
 Deshdrohi (2008) – Special Appearance
 Ssimran (2009) (post-production)
 Right Yaaa Wrong (2009)
 Pratigya (2009) (in production)
 Kisme Kitna Hai Dum (2009) (in production)
 Reejhan (2009) (in production)
 Veer (2010)
 Ek Ka Do Aur Dhoka Ek (2011) (in production)
 Diary Of A Butterfly (2012) - Ravi Bajaj
 Love U Crazy Girl (2014) - Akash Rathod (Police Inspector)
 Raja (2019) - Munna Singh (Bhojpuri film) Footpath (2003 film) Young Aryan Vaid  Soorat pe teri

References

External links
 
 

Male beauty pageant winners
1976 births
Indian male film actors
Indian male models
Living people
Bigg Boss (Hindi TV series) contestants